Thomas Sidney Sims (born April 18, 1967) is a former American football defensive tackle who played four seasons in the National Football League (NFL) with the Kansas City Chiefs and Indianapolis Colts. He was drafted by the Chiefs in the sixth round of the 1990 NFL Draft. He first played college football for the Broncos of Western Michigan University before transferring to play for the Pittsburgh Panthers of the University of Pittsburgh. He attended Cass Technical High School in Detroit, Michigan.

College career
Sims graduated from Pittsburgh with a business degree in 1990.

Professional career
Sims was drafted by the Kansas City Chiefs in the sixth round, with the 152nd overall pick, of the 1990 NFL Draft. In early September 1990, before the start of the regular season, Sims was placed on injured reserve with an ankle injury. He did not appear in a game in 1990. He played in 14 games for the Chiefs in 1991 and recorded 6 total tackles. He signed with the Chiefs in July 1992. He appeared in 12 games in 1992, recording 12 total tackles, 3.0 sacks and 1 fumble recovery. He was released by the Chiefs on September 4, 1993.

Sims signed with the Indianapolis Colts in early November 1993. He played in 5 games, starting 3, for the Colts in 1993 and recorded 30 total tackles and 1.0 sack. He played in 16 games, starting 1, in 1994 and recorded 12 solo tackles and 5 tackle assists.

Sims was signed by the Minnesota Vikings on June 2, 1995. He was released by the Vikings on August 28, 1995.

Sims signed with the Kansas City Chiefs on March 18, 1996. He spent time with the Chiefs during the 1996 regular season but did not appear in any games.

Coaching career
Sims has been the defensive line coach at seven colleges. He coached the Hilltoppers of Western Kentucky University from 1997 to 1999, the Eagles of Eastern Michigan University in 2000, the Golden Gophers of the University of Minnesota from 2001 to 2004, the Fighting Illini of the University of Illinois from 2005 to 2008, the Jayhawks of the University of Kansas in 2009, the Penguins of Youngstown State University from 2010 to 2014, and the Pittsburgh Panthers from 2015 to 2016.

Sims was with the Ravens Camp in 2017 before being hired as the defensive line coach at Savannah State in 2018. The following years, Sims was promoted to defensive coordinator by new head coach Shawn Quinn, where he remained through the 2021 season. In his first year as a coordinator, Sims lead the number 1 scoring defense in the SIAC, and helped lead the Tigers to a 7-3 record. This was the first winning season for the Tigers in over 20 years.

In March 2022, Sims joined the staff at Arkansas-Pine Bluff as the co-defensive coordinator and defensive line coach.

References

Notes

External links
Just Sports Stats

Living people
1967 births
American football defensive tackles
African-American players of American football
Western Michigan Broncos football players
Pittsburgh Panthers football players
Kansas City Chiefs players
Indianapolis Colts players
Minnesota Vikings players
Western Kentucky Hilltoppers football coaches
Eastern Michigan Eagles football coaches
Minnesota Golden Gophers football coaches
Illinois Fighting Illini football coaches
Kansas Jayhawks football coaches
Youngstown State Penguins football coaches
Pittsburgh Panthers football coaches
Players of American football from Detroit
21st-century African-American people
20th-century African-American sportspeople